Govt. Shahid Smriti College is a post-graduate educational institution located in Muktagachha in the Mymensingh  division of Bangladesh.

History 
Shaheed Smriti Government College is located in Muktagachha upazila of Mymensingh district. The college was established in 1966 in a part of Muktagachha Rajbari Bhavan. It was declared a government college in 1960.The college currently offers higher secondary, undergraduate (pass) and undergraduate (honors) courses. And all the courses in the college together There are about 10 thousand students.

Educational Courses

High School
 Science
  Human
 Business education

Graduation (pass)
 2001 - B.A. (Pass)
 6002 - B.Sc. (Pass)
 2004 - BBS (Pass)

Graduation (honors)
1001 - Bengali
1101 - English
1901 - Political Science
2101 - Social
2020 - Economy
2501 - Accounting
2601 - Management

References

Colleges affiliated to National University, Bangladesh